Werner Grieshofer (born 22 February 1960) is an Austrian rowing coxswain. He competed in the men's coxed pair event at the 1972 Summer Olympics, and was 12 years and 187 days old at the time.

References

1960 births
Living people
Austrian male rowers
Olympic rowers of Austria
Rowers at the 1972 Summer Olympics
Place of birth missing (living people)
Coxswains (rowing)